Kings Mountain may refer to:


Places
 Kings Mountain (Alaska), a summit in Alaska
 Kings Mountain, California, an unincorporated community in San Mateo County
 Kings Mountain, Kentucky, an unincorporated community
 Kings Mountain, North Carolina, a city in North Carolina
 Kings Pinnacle, a mountain in North Carolina near the city of Kings Mountain
 Kings Mountain National Military Park near Blacksburg, South Carolina
 Kings Mountain State Park, a state park in South Carolina that is adjacent to the National Military Park

Other uses
 Battle of Kings Mountain, a battle of the American Revolutionary War
 Kings Mountain Railroad, a former shortline railroad that served South Carolina
 Kings Mountain manzanita or Arctostaphylos regismontana, a shrub